Liede Station is a station on Line 5 of the Guangzhou Metro. It is located under the junction of Huacheng Avenue and Liede Avenue, in Liede, Tianhe District, near the Guangzhou International Finance Center in Zhujiang New Town. The station opened on 28December 2009.

Station layout

Exits

References

Railway stations in China opened in 2009
Guangzhou Metro stations in Tianhe District